The following is a list of episodes of the Canadian cooking show MasterChef Canada. The series premiered on January 20, 2014, on the CTV network.

Series overview

Episodes

Season 1 (2014)

Season 2 (2015)
Season 2 premiered on CTV on February 1, 2015, following its telecast of Super Bowl XLIX. The premiere was originally meant to air on February 8, 2015, but was pushed ahead to air after the game in place of Spun Out, whose second-season premiere was pulled from the slot after cast member J. P. Manoux was charged with voyeurism.

Season 3 (2016)

Season 4 (2017)

Season 5 (2018)

Season 6 (2019)

Season 7 (2021)

References

MasterChef
MasterChef Canada